Antonio Romero Boza (born 12 October 1995) is a Spanish footballer who plays as a central midfielder.

Club career
Born in Mairena del Aljarafe, Seville, Andalusia, Romero joined Sevilla FC's youth setup in 2008. He made his debut for the reserves on 24 August 2014, coming on as a second-half substitute in a 0–1 away loss against Arroyo CP.

Romero scored his first goal as a senior on 25 January 2015, netting the second in a 2–0 home win against UD Almería B. On 5 May 2016 he renewed his contract until 2018, and finished the campaign – which ended in promotion to Segunda División – with two goals in 28 appearances.

On 23 August 2016, Romero was loaned to third division side Mérida AD for one year. On 24 July of the following year, he moved to fellow league team CD Mirandés, helping in their promotion to the second division in 2019.

On 20 July 2019, Romero signed for CE Sabadell FC, still in division three, but suffered a serious knee injury in August which kept him out of the entire 2019–20 campaign, which ended in promotion. On 19 December 2019, he renewed his contract until 2021.

Romero made his professional debut on 19 September 2020, starting in a 1–2 away loss against Rayo Vallecano.

References

External links

1995 births
Living people
People from Aljarafe
Sportspeople from the Province of Seville
Spanish footballers
Footballers from Andalusia
Association football midfielders
Segunda División players
Segunda División B players
Sevilla Atlético players
Mérida AD players
CD Mirandés footballers
CE Sabadell FC footballers